Hawaii has been home to many notable people who have become well-known beyond the shores of the islands.  Listed below are notable people who have called Hawaii home during some significant part of their lives.

A

Brian Adams (1963–2007), professional wrestler; born in Kona
Benny Agbayani, professional baseball player, born in Honolulu
Keiko Agena, actress
Daniel Akaka, first US Senator with Hawaiian ancestry
Akebono Tarō (born Chad Rowan), sumo wrestler, born in Waimanalo
Dennis Alexio, former World Kickboxing Champion, lived and fought out of Honolulu
Robert Allerton, industrialist and patron-owner of Allerton Garden, Kauai
Tyson Alualu, professional football player, born in Honolulu
Chang Apana, folk figure who inspired Charlie Chan; worked for the Honolulu Police Department
S. Haunani Apoliona, Office of Hawaiian Affairs trustee, chairperson of OHA Board of Trustees
George Ariyoshi, first Japanese-American elected governor

B

Buck Baker or Dr. William Baker, conductor
Bob Ballard, discoverer of Titanic wreck, received degree from the University of Hawaii
Kimee Balmilero, Filipino-American, Broadway actor, Miss Saigon, Mamma Mia, Hi-5
Gabe Baltazar, Filipino saxophone player
Danny Barcelona, Filipino-American jazz-band drummer for Louis Armstrong
Roseanne Barr, actress in Roseanne, macadamia nut farmer and activist
Sasha Barrese, actress
Chris Barron (1968), vocalist with Spin Doctors, born at Pearl Harbor
Donn Beach, restaurateur of Don the Beachcomber tiki restaurant, died in Honolulu
Greg Beeman, director-producer
Larry Beil, journalist, graduated from the University of Hawaii at Manoa
Barbi Benton, model/actress, has a home in Hawaii
Henri Berger, composer and royal bandmaster of the Kingdom of Hawaii
Daniel Bess, actor, Rick Allen on 24
Ashley Bickerton, contemporary artist, painter, sculptor
Hiram Bingham I, missionary
Hiram Bingham II, missionary
Hiram Bingham III, US Senator from Connecticut, discovered Machu Picchu
Bernice Pauahi Bishop, Hawaiian princess and philanthropist
Charles Reed Bishop, banker, philanthropist, husband of Bernice Pauahi Bishop
Bill Bixby, actor/director; had residence in Hawaii
Don Blanding, poet
Richard Blood, also known as Ricky The Dragon Steamboat, Ricky Steamboat, Rick Steamboat, professional wrestler, born in Honolulu
Daryl Bonilla, Hawaii-based actor, born in Honolulu
Richard Boone, actor, who lived in Hawaii for seven years
Robert Sidney Bowen, author, died of cancer in Honolulu in 1977
Bradajo, poet known for writing in Hawaiian Pidgin
Beau Bridges, actor, attended University of Hawaii at Manoa
Darin Brooks, actor on Days of Our Lives
Jason Brooks, actor, splits time between Hawaii and Los Angeles
Andy Bumatai, Hawaii-based comedian and actor
Ray Bumatai, Hawaii-based actor and producer, died in Honolulu
Redmond Burke, pediatric heart surgeon
John A. Burns, second Governor of Hawaii, 1962–1974, interred at National Memorial Cemetery of the Pacific in Honolulu
Eric Byler, director of Charlotte Sometimes and Americanese, attended Moanalua High School, Honolulu

C

William Robert Caddy, World War II Medal of Honor recipient, interred at National Memorial Cemetery of the Pacific in Honolulu
Daryl Cagle, editorial cartoonist
Sarah Wayne Callies, actress
James Campbell, founder of the Estate of James Campbell, a major landowner in Hawaii
Joseph Campbell, author, lived and died in Honolulu
George Ham Cannon, World War II Medal of Honor recipient
Glenn Cannon, actor, Co-director of the Cinematic and Digital Arts Program at the University of Hawaii at Manoa
Tia Carrere, singer, actress
Alexander Cartwright, father of American baseball
Steve Case, former Chairman and CEO of America Online
Benjamin J. Cayetano, first Filipino-American governor
Cedric Ceballos, basketball player, rap artist
Byron Chamberlain, athlete, born in Honolulu
Michael Chamberlain, film director, current resident of Honolulu
Richard Chamberlain, actor, current resident of Hawaii
Wah Chang, Hollywood designer
Ben Chapman, actor, longtime resident of Oahu, Hawaii
Duane "DOG" Chapman, bounty hunter, has lived in Hawaii since 1989
Charo, entertainer, longtime resident
Tom Cheney, cartoonist
Brian Ching, professional soccer (football) player for the US Men's National Team and Houston Dynamo, of Major League Soccer
Herbert Choy, first Asian-American federal judge in US history
Sam Choy, chef
Kam Fong Chun, police officer/actor
Bryan Clay, Olympic athlete
Archibald Cleghorn, father of Princess Victoria Kaiulani, and husband of Princess Miriam K. Likelike
Princess Victoria Kaiulani Cleghorn, last Hawaiian princess
Harlan Cleveland, DIKW
Titus Coan, early missionary to Hawaii, founder of Haili Church
Ed Cobb, singer, member of the group The Four Preps
Scott Coffey, actor, born in Hawaii, studied in Honolulu
Bruce Cooil, statistical modeler, born and raised in Honolulu
Captain James Cook, British explorer, died at Kealakekua Bay
Francis Judd Cooke, composer
Gordon Cooper, astronaut, lived in Hawaii
Mother Marianne Cope, the successor to Father Damien
David Copperfield, illusionist, early career at Pagoda Hotel
Matt Corboy, actor, born and raised in Honolulu
Nancy Cordes, CBS News correspondent
Ed Corney, IFBB Hall of Fame bodybuilder
Buster Crabbe, athlete and actor, studied at the Punahou School in Honolulu
John P. Craven PhD, JD, ocean engineering scientist, developer of OTEC and law professor
Richard E. Cunha, cinematographer

D

Mark Dacascos, actor and martial artist, born in Honolulu
Anthony Peter Damato, World War II Medal of Honor recipient
Father Damien, priest, missionary to the Lepers of Molokai, beatified
Ron Darling, MLB pitcher and broadcaster
Gavan Daws, Shoal of Time author, Hawaiiana historian
Frank Delima, comedian
Richard Denning, actor, owned residence in Hawaii
Martin Denny, composer
Benjamin Dillingham, businessman
Walter F. Dillingham, industrialist
Jordan Dizon, NFL linebacker for Detroit Lions
Jimmie Dodd, actor, died in Honolulu
James Drummond Dole, pineapple magnate
Sanford B. Dole, territorial governor
Isami Doi, artist and printmaker
Richard Donner, director, owns residence in Hawaii
David Douglas, botanist, namesake of Douglas-fir tree
Alex Dreier, television journalist and actor
Doris Duke, heiress, owner of "Shangri-La" residence on Black Point
Ann Dunham, mother of President Barack Obama
Dyrus, real name Marcus Hill, professional League of Legends player

E

Jason Elam, NFL kicker, attended college in Hawaii
Yvonne Elliman, singer
Kate Elliott, science fiction and fantasy writer
Kenny Endo, professional Taiko player
Georgia Engel, actress, attended college in Hawaii
Jean Erdman, dancer, choreographer
Neil Everett, ESPN sportcaster

F

Nuu Faaola, former NFL running back
Mary Elizabeth Pruett Farrington, Republican congressional representative
Scott Feldman, Major League Baseball pitcher (Houston Astros)
Sid Fernandez, baseball pitcher, born in Honolulu
Tony Fiammetta, fullback for the Chicago Bears
Hiram Leong Fong, first Chinese-American United States Senator from Hawaii, interred at Nuuanu Cemetery in Honolulu
Khalil Fong, Chinese singer based in Hong Kong, lived until age 6 in Kauai
Leo Ford, actor, operated Pacific Paradise Tours
Russ Francis, NFL tight end, New England Patriots, San Francisco 49ers
Herman Frazier, 1976 Olympic gold medalist, head of 2004 US Olympic team
Harry Fujiwara, professional wrestler, born in Hawaii

G

David Gallaher, writer of Green Lantern Corps, born in Honolulu
Brickwood Galuteria, politician, elected chair of the Hawaii Democratic Party in 2004
Sunny Garcia, pro surfer
Loyal Garner, singer
Brian Gaskill, actor, born in Honolulu
Thomas Gill, lieutenant governor and US Representative
Henry G. Ginaca, engineer and inventor of the machine that peeled and cored pineapples being prepared for canning
Gary Goldman, producer, graduated from the University of Hawaii in December 1971
Ah Chew Goo, former coach of the University of Hawaii men's basketball team and a star high school basketball player
Kurt Gouveia, pro football player
Lauren Graham, TV actress
Wendy Lee Gramm, economist, wife of Phil Gramm
Glen Grant, folklorist and author
Erin Gray, actress
Dave Guard, singer with Kingston Trio, born in Hawaii

H

Brian Haberlin, comic book artist, co-creator of Witchblade
Marie Louise Habets, ex-nun on whose life The Nun's Story was based
Lance Hahn, musician, co-founder of the prolific punk band J_Church_(band), born in Honolulu
Bethany Hamilton, shark attack survivor, surfer
Laird Hamilton, surfer, monster wave rider, inventor of tow-in surfing
George Harrison, musician, former Beatle; had residence in Hawaii
Kayo Hatta, film director
Hilo Hattie, also known as Clara H. Nelson, Hawaiian entertainer, born in Honolulu
Dick Haymes, actor, lived in Hawaii in 1953
Michael Haynes III, professional wrestler, born in Honolulu
Erik Hazelhoff Roelfzema, author, resident of Hawaii
Christian Hedemann, (1852–1932), Danish-born engineer and pioneering amateur photographer
Cecil Heftel, United States Representative and businessman
Geoff Heise, actor
George Helm, Kahoolawe Ohana activist
Marie Helvin, top model of the 1970s and 1980s
George Herbig, astronomer
Harvey Hess, lyric poet, librettist
Ryan Higa, YouTuber known by his YouTube username "nigahiga", born in Hilo
John Hillerman, actor, best known for his role in Magnum, P.I.
Barron Hilton, heir of Hilton Hotel chain, was stationed in Hawaii in World War II
Dave Hlubek, lead guitarist and founding member of Molly Hatchet
Coco Ho, professional surfer
Don Ho, entertainer, born in Kakaako and died near Waikiki Beach
Hoku Ho, singer
Michael Ho, professional surfer 
Michael Hoffman film director, born in Hawaii
Max Holloway, Mixed Martial Arts (MMA) fighter, former Featherweight Champion
Josh Holloway, actor on the television show Lost in Hawaii Kai, Honolulu
Garrett Hongo, Japanese-American poet
Mark Keali'i Ho'omalu, singer featured in Lilo & Stitch
kuʻualoha hoʻomanawanui, Native Hawaiian author
Robert T. Hoshibata, Bishop of the United Methodist Church
Christian Hosoi, professional skateboarder of Hawaiian descent
Charlie Hough, MLB pitcher
Victor Stewart Kaleoaloha Houston, United States Representative from the Territory of Hawaii
Kelly Hu, Miss Hawaii Teen USA 1985, Miss Teen USA 1985, Miss Hawaii USA 1993
Huening Kai, Korean singer-songwriter from Honolulu
Matthias Hues, actor, moved to Hawaii
Mike Huff, MLB outfielder
Kathryn Hulme, author of The Nun's Story
Wayne Hunter, offensive tackle for New York Jets

I

Curtis Iaukea, Secretary of Foreign Affairs for the Kingdom of Hawaii
Carrie Ann Inaba, actress, choreographer, judge from ABC's Dancing with the Stars and host from CBS' The Talk
Enson Inoue, mixed martial artist
Daniel K. Inouye, United States Senator for Hawaii, 1963–2012
Andy Irons, surfer
Yuna Ito, Japanese pop singer from Honolulu

J

Thomas Jaggar, geologist and founder of the Hawaiian Volcano Observatory
William Paul Jarrett, United States Representative from the Territory of Hawaii
Arthur Johnsen, artist and painter of Hawaiiana
Jack Johnson, singer, musician, songwriter, and documentary filmmaker, born in Oahu
Lia Marie Johnson, actress, singer, guitarist, born in Wahiawa, Hawaii
Daniel Jones, member of rock & roll band 7th Order, grew up in Honolulu
Cris Judd, actor, partly raised in Hawaii
Gerrit P. Judd, missionary and advisor

K
Ka–Kg

Kaahumanu, Hawaiian queen
Duke Paoa Kahanamoku, three-time Olympic gold medalist (swimming), surfer, born and died in Honolulu, interred at Oahu Cemetery in Honolulu
Carole Kai, singer and philanthropist
Natasha Kai, former US WNT soccer player, for Philadelphia Independence, born in Kahuku, Hawaii
Henry J. Kaiser, industrialist
Victoria Kaiulani, Hawaiian princess, interred at Royal Mausoleum in Honolulu
David Kalākaua, king, interred at Royal Mausoleum in Honolulu
Jonah Kuhio Kalanianaole, Prince of Hawaii
Harry Kalas, sportscaster, broadcast Hawaii Islanders
Emma Kaleleonalani, Hawaiian monarch
Israel Kamakawiwo‘ole, entertainer and singer
Stacy Kamano, actress
Kamehameha I, monarch who united the Hawaiian islands, interred at Royal Mausoleum in Honolulu
Kamehameha V, last of the House of Kamehameha
Lisa Linn Kanae, poet and professor of English
Herb Kawainui Kāne, artist, historian, and cofounder of the Polynesian Voyaging Society
Chiefess Kapiolani, Hawaiian alii
Queen Kapiolani, Hawaiian queen
Gilbert Lani Kauhi, actor
Kaumualii, last king of Kauai
Guy Kawasaki, official Apple Computer evangelist
Princess Ruth Keelikolani, Princess of the Kingdom of Hawaii, largest landowner in Hawaii
Klaus Keil, geologist, known for mineral keilite
Rabbit Kekai, professional surfer whose mentor was Duke Kahanamoku, born in Honolulu, teaches surfing in Waikiki Beach
Ma'ake Kemoeatu, defensive tackle for the Baltimore Ravens
Douglas Kennedy, actor, died in Honolulu, interred at National Memorial Cemetery of the Pacific in Honolulu
Keala Kennelly, professional surfer and actress, John from Cincinnati, Blue Crush, Step into Liquid
Douglas Kenney, actor, died in Kauai
Ed Kenney, actor and singer
Steven L. Kent, novelist, raised in Honolulu, attended Kalani High School

Ki–Kz

Isaac C. Kidd, World War II Medal of Honor recipient, died in Pearl Harbor, interred at  Memorial
Nicole Kidman, Australian actress, born in Honolulu
Hau'oli Kikaha, linebacker for the New Orleans Saints
Daniel Dae Kim, actor with roles in Lost and Hawaii Five-0
Jason Kincaid, professional wrestler, born in Honolulu
Harry Kim, first Korean-American elected mayor in US
Rebekah Kim, Korean-American singer and former member of South Korean girl group After School
Ricky Kim, Korean-American model and actor
Darren Kimura, businessman, born in Hilo, attended Waiakea High School
Samuel Wilder King, Governor of the Territory of Hawaii and United States Representative from the Territory of Hawaii
Robert Kiyosaki, author of financial books
Terence Knapp, actor and director, lives in Honolulu
Konishiki (born Salevaa Atisanoe), sumo wrestler
Glen Kozlowski, NFL wide receiver
Olin Kreutz, NFL center 
Shogo Kubo, professional skater, lives with his family in Oahu
Kūkahi, musician, born in Honolulu
Clyde Kusatsu, actor, born in Honolulu, attended Iolani High School

L

Travis LaBoy, linebacker for San Diego Chargers
Bu Laia, comedian
Mike Lambert, USA national volleyball team, AVP MVP
George Parsons Lathrop, journalist, poet
Alfred Laureta, jurist, first U. S. federal judge of Filipino ancestry
Shawn Lauvao, guard for Washington Redskins
Vicki Lawrence, actress, entertainer, lived in Maui for a time after the Carol Burnett Show
Brook Mahealani Lee, Miss Hawaii USA 1997, Miss USA 1997, Miss Universe 1997
Christopher Lee, executive of TriStar Pictures, chairman of Academy for Creative Media for University of Hawaii
Jason Scott Lee, actor of Hawaiian descent, graduate of Pearl City High School
Kui Lee, born Kuiokalani Lee, musician, composer of "I'll Remember You" sung by Don Ho, Elvis Presley and Andy Williams
Liliuokalani (1838–1917), Queen of Hawaii 1891–1893; last Hawaiian monarch
Charles Lindbergh, iconic aviator, lived and died on Maui
Linda Lingle, Governor of Hawaii 2002–10; born in Missouri
Susanna Lo, screenwriter, director and producer, graduate and student body president of Star of the Sea High School
Phil Loadholt, offensive tackle for the Minnesota Vikings
Oren Ethelbirt Long, first governor of Hawaii, interred at Oahu Cemetery in Honolulu
Tai Sing Loo, photographer, born in Hawaii
Gerry López, professional surfer, born in Hawaii
Jack Lord, actor, star of Hawaii Five-O, died in Honolulu
Edward Tsang Lu, astronaut
Agnes Lum, bikini supermodel popular in Japan, born in Honolulu
Mike Lum, MLB outfielder
King Lunalilo, King of Hawaii January 8, 1873 – February 3, 1874
Rod Lurie, film director, spent part of his childhood in Hawaii
Arthur Lyman, musician
Ben Lyon, actor, died in Honolulu
Lorenzo Lyons, minister and author of the beloved hymn "Hawai`i Aloha"

M

Chris Fuamatu-Ma'afala, football player
Kenneth MacDonald, British actor
Gardner McKay, actor/writer, died in Honolulu
Kaluka Maiava, linebacker for the Cleveland Browns
Peter Maivia, professional wrestler
Eduardo Malapit, (1933–2007), first US mayor of Filipino ancestry
Larry Manetti, actor, best known for Magnum, P.I.
Vince Manuwai, football player
Ferdinand Marcos, former Philippine president, lived and died in exile in Honolulu
Marcus Mariota, NFL quarterback, 2014 Heisman trophy winner
Markiplier, real name Mark Fischbach, YouTuber and Let's Player, born in O'ahu but raised in Cincinnati, Ohio
Bruno Mars, stage name for Peter Hernandez, singer-songwriter and music producer
Francis A. Marzen, religious leader
Thalia Massie, wife of a Navy lieutenant, from the publicized 1931 rape case
Josh Mauga, linebacker for the Kansas City Chiefs
Kevin McCollum, producer, graduated from Punahou School in Honolulu
Glenn Medeiros, singer, songwriter
melody. (Melody Miyuki Ishikawa), singer of J-pop music
James Mercer, lead singer and guitarist of indie rock band The Shins
W.S. Merwin, poet, longtime resident of Maui
Stein Metzger, beach volleyball player and olympian
James A. Michener, novelist, wrote about Hawaii
Al Michaels, sports broadcaster, began his sports broadcasting career in Hawaii in 1968
Bette Midler, actress and entertainer, graduate of A.W. Radford High School
Patsy Takemoto Mink, United States Congresswoman and author of the Title IX Amendment to the Higher Education Act
Tau Moe, singer, died in Laie, Hawaii
Tom Moffatt, entertainment producer, former DJ with KPOI
Jason Momoa, actor and model, born in Honolulu
Darius A. Monsef IV, internet entrepreneur and philanthropist
Carissa Moore, professional surfer
Joe Moore, actor and journalist based in Honolulu
Scott Moore, screenwriter
Jon Moritsugu, film director, born in Honolulu
Jim Morrison, lawyer, helicopter pilot, lived in Hawaii
Roger E. Mosley, actor, best known for his role in Magnum, P.I.
Tahj Mowry, actor, born in Honolulu
Don Muraco, professional wrestler, born in Pūpūkea, Hawaii
Arthur Murray, entertainer, died in Honolulu
Musashimaru (born Fiamalu Penitani), sumo wrestler

N

 Jim Nabors, actor and singer
 Linda Nagata, novelist
 Kellye Nakahara, actor
 Lane Nishikawa, actor, director, performance artist
 Al Noga, pro football player
 Jordan Norwood, pro football player

O

Barack Obama, 44th President of the United States, born in Honolulu (August 4, 1961)
Kimo von Oelhoffen, football player
Bobo Olson, world champion boxer, hall of famer
Eileen Olszewski, professional female boxer
Timothy Olyphant, actor
Danny Ongais, racecar driver
Ellison Onizuka, astronaut
Julie Ow, actress
Chad Owens, professional football player

P

Gabby Pahinui, musician
Grace Park, actress
Janel Parrish, actress
Richard Parsons, Time-Warner CEO
William S. Patout, III, sugar grower in Iberia Parish; lived in Honolulu in the 1960s
William A. Patterson, United Airlines president, 1934–1966
B.J. Penn, professional mixed martial artist
Jeff Peterson, slack key guitarist
Rick Pitino, basketball coach; began career in Hawaii
Gregory Poirier, writer, director, producer
Troy Polamalu, professional football player
Kawaipuna Prejean, Hawaiian activist
Kelly Preston, actress
Albert Pyun, film director
Kalani Pe'a, singer-songwriter

Q

Maggie Q (born Maggie Denise Quigley), actress, model
Maria Quiban, weather anchor for KTTV-TV in Los Angeles

R

Dale Radomski, stuntman
Dominic Raiola, football player
Larry Ramos, actor, The King and I; entertainer and singer with The New Christy Minstrels, and the Association; born on Kauai 
Jonah Ray, actor, comedian 
Kealii Reichel (born 1961), Hawaiian singer, dancer, chanter and scholar
Syngman Rhee, first president of South Korea, later exiled to Hawaii
James O. Richardson, Commander in Chief, U.S. Pacific Fleet 1940–1941 at Pearl Harbor, Hawaii
Malea Rose actor, writer, producer, founder of skincare company
Eric Roberts, actor, resident
Red Rocha, basketball player, coach
George Rodiek, gardener Walker Estate, diplomat and Hindu-German conspirator
Makua Rothman (born 1984), world champion surfer
Anthony Ruivivar, actor, Third Watch
Robert Rusler, actor, Babylon 5
Peggy Ryan, dancer and choreographer

S

Buffy Sainte-Marie, singer, Academy Award-winning songwriter, Native American educator and activist, lives on Kauai
Stan Sakai, comic book creator
Harold Sakata, Olympic medalist and actor, Goldfinger
Lenn Sakata, baseball player
Carolyn Sapp, Miss America 1992
Bronson Sardinha, baseball player
Garret T. Sato, actor
Nicole Scherzinger, dancer-singer, The Pussycat Dolls
Amanda Schull, ballerina and actress
Tom Selleck, actor; lived in Hawaii during Magnum, P.I.
Shag, real name Josh Agle, artist
Bob Shane, singer with Kingston Trio
James Shigeta, actor
Jake Shimabukuro, ukulele musician
Eric Shinseki, US Army general and 34th Chief of Staff
William Herbert Shipman (1854–1943), influential businessman
Calvin C.J. Sia, pediatrician
Mana Silva, safety for the Dallas Cowboys
Aloysius Snuffleupagus, entertainer
Shannyn Sossamon, actress and musician
Claus Spreckels, developer
Mike Starr, bassist, Alice in Chains
Ricky Steamboat, professional wrestler, born in Honolulu
Karen Steele, actress
Jake Steinfeld, fitness host of Body by Jake, which was taped in Hawaii
Don Stroud, actor
Kazimir Strzepek, cartoonist
Sun Yat-sen, Qing dynasty revolutionary, Provisional President of the Republic of China
Kurt Suzuki, catcher for the Washington Nationals
Heidi Swedberg, actress, Susan Ross on Seinfeld
John M. Systermans, Belgian-born follower of Father Damien who worked extensively in Hollywood

T

Cary-Hiroyuki Tagawa, actor
Yuta Tabuse, basketball player
Tua Tagovailoa, American football quarterback
Takamiyama (born Jesse Kuhaulua, 1944), sumo wrestler
Reuben Tam, artist and educator
Mosi Tatupu, NFL player, attended school in Hawaii
Freddie Tavares, musician and inventor
Kevin S. Tenney, director, screenwriter
Manti Te'o, football player
Paul Theroux, travel writer and novelist
John Paul Thomas, artist, educator
Nainoa Thompson, native Hawaiian navigator
Geoff Thorpe, guitarist with Vicious Rumors and 7th Order
Asa Thurston (1787–1868), in first company of missionaries to Hawaii
Lorrin A. Thurston, grandson of missionaries, leader in 1893 monarchy overthrow and leader of the Provisional Government of Hawaii
Lee Tonouchi, pidgin author
Haunani-Kay Trask, native Hawaiian professor of Hawaiian Studies at the University of Hawaii, and political activist
Jasmine Trias, singer, American Idol finalist
Corky Trinidad, cartoonist, Honolulu Star-Bulletin
Esera Tuaolo, football player
Mosi Tatupu, football player
Mark Tuinei, football player
Merlin Tuttle, mammalogist, Honolulu

U

Max Unger, center for the New Orleans Saints

V

Charles L. Veach (1944–1995), astronaut
Camile Velasco, singer, American Idol finalist
Shane Victorino, baseball player
Brian Viloria, boxer and Olympic athlete

W

Scott Waddle, commander of the  submarine during the Ehime Maru incident
John Waihee, first Native Hawaiian governor
William Wang, businessman, founder and CEO of Vizio
Megan Ward, actress
Justin Wayne, MLB pitcher
Charlie Wedemeyer, prep player of the decade: football, basketball, baseball
Guy Whimper, NFL offensive tackle
Jeff Widener, journalistic photographer,  noted for Tiananmen Square photo
Michelle Wie, LPGA golfer
Milt Wilcox, MLB pitcher
Robert William Wilcox (1855–1903), native Hawaiian revolutionary, soldier, and US Representative from the Territory of Hawaii
Jerome Williams, MLB pitcher
Brandon Wilson, Lowell Thomas Award-winning author of non-fiction travel narratives and explorer
Taylor Wily, sumo wrestler and actor
Charles F. Winslow, 19th-century physician and atomic theorist
Alan Wong, chef
Kevin Wong, US beach volleyball Olympian, first Asian-American Olympic beach volleyball athlete, born in Pearl City, Hawai'i
Kolten Wong, MLB player
Kirby Wright, novelist and poet born in Honolulu and raised on Oahu and Moloka'i
Robert Wyland, artist

Y

Roy Yamaguchi, chef
Lois-Ann Yamanaka, novelist
Ryuzo Yanagimachi, assisted fertilization and cloning pioneer
Kirby Yates, relief pitcher for the New York Yankees
Tyler Yates, former MLB pitcher
Wally Kaname Yonamine, former Japanese baseball player
John Young, first European to become "Hawaiian ali'i" and buried in the Royal Mausoleum
Keone Young, actor

Z

Zhang Xueliang, Chinese WWII General

Gallery

See also

 List of Hawaii suffragists
Lists of Americans

References